The Sakeji horseshoe bat (Rhinolophus sakejiensis) is a species of bat in the family Rhinolophidae. It is endemic to Zambia.  Its natural habitats are subtropical and tropical dry and moist lowland forest, and moist savanna.   It is threatened by habitat loss. It was discovered in 2000.

References

Mammals of Zambia
Rhinolophidae
Endemic fauna of Zambia
Mammals described in 2002
Taxonomy articles created by Polbot
Bats of Africa